The Asian Human Rights Commission (AHRC) is an independent, non-governmental body that promotes human rights in Asia and mobilizes Asian and international public opinion to obtain relief and redress for the victims of human rights violations. It was founded in 1986 by a prominent group of jurists and human rights activists in Asia and serves to promote civil and political rights, as well as economic, social and cultural rights.

AHRC endeavours to achieve the following objectives stated in the Asian Charter: "Many Asian states have guarantees of human rights in their constitutions, and many of them have ratified international human rights instruments. However, there continues to be a wide gap between rights enshrined in these documents and the abject reality that denies people of their rights. Asian states must take urgent action to implement the human rights of their citizens and residents."

Its sister organization, the Asian Legal Resource Centre (ALRC), holds General Consultative Status with the United Nations Economic and Social Council (ECOSOC). The AHRC and ALRC are both based in Hong Kong.

Human rights issues in Asia 

On the eve of the International Day of the Disappeared in 2007, AHRC ranked the Philippines among the top eight countries in Asia where forced disappearances of activists are not just rampant but are carried out with impunity. Sri Lanka heads the list (statement posted on its website www.ahrchk.net). The activists took part in the Human Rights School Session of the AHRC for 2007. The AHRC listed the other countries where forced disappearances take place with impunity: Pakistan, Indonesia, Bangladesh, Nepal, Thailand, Philippines, and parts of India.

Further, AHRC had evidence to show that Myanmar junta uses broom-wielding gangs or Swan-ar Shin heavies not guns to crush dissent (fuel price protests).

On September 28, 2007, the Asian Human Rights Commission (AHRC) criticized the Writ of Amparo and Habeas Data (Philippines) for being insufficient: "Though it responds to practical areas it is still necessary that further action must be taken in addition to this. The legislative bodies, House of Representatives and Senate, should also initiate its own actions promptly and without delay. They must enact laws which ensure protection of rights—laws against torture and enforced disappearance and laws to afford adequate legal remedies to victims." AHRC objected since the writ failed to protect non-witnesses, even if they too face threats or risk to their lives.

See also
 Human rights commissions
 International Day in Support of Victims of Torture

References

External links
 

Human rights organisations based in Hong Kong
Organizations established in 1986
1986 establishments in Hong Kong